WKCY may refer to:

 WKCY (AM), a radio station (1300 AM) licensed to Harrisonburg, Virginia, United States
 WKCY-FM, a radio station (104.3 FM) licensed to Harrisonburg, Virginia, United States